Princess Hildegard of Bavaria (German: Hildegard Luise Charlotte Theresia Friederike von Bayern; 10 June 1825 – 2 April 1864) was the seventh child and fourth daughter of Ludwig I of Bavaria and Therese of Saxe-Hildburghausen.

Life

Marriage
On 1 May 1844 in Munich, Hildegard married Archduke Albert of Austria, eldest son of Archduke Charles, Duke of Teschen and Princess Henrietta of Nassau-Weilburg. She thereafter became known as Archduchess Hildegard. She and her husband had 3 children:

Issue

 
During her stay in Munich for the funeral of her brother King Maximilian II (1811-1864) in March 1864, Archduchess Hildegard became ill with a lung inflammation and pleurisy, and died.

Ancestry

1825 births
1864 deaths
House of Wittelsbach
Bavarian princesses
Duchesses of Teschen
Austrian princesses
Nobility from Munich
Burials at the Imperial Crypt
Daughters of kings